The 1943–44 Magyar Kupa (English: Hungarian Cup) was the 21st season of Hungary's annual knock-out cup football competition.

Final

Replay

See also
 1943–44 Nemzeti Bajnokság I

References

External links
 Official site 
 soccerway.com

1943–44 in Hungarian football
1943–44 domestic association football cups
1943-44